Match referee Mike Denness, a former England captain, found six India players guilty of various offences during the second test match of India's 2001 tour of South Africa, played between 16-20 November 2001 at St George's Park, Port Elizabeth. The severity of Denness's punishment to an unprecedented six players was viewed by the India media as motivated by racism, outraged the general public and remains controversial to this day.

Second Test
In the laws of cricket, tampering with the ball is a serious offence, and considered to be cheating. Tendulkar was caught on camera running his nail around the seam of the ball multiple times, clearly breaking the laws and spirit of the game. The other incidents were examples of players excessively appealing, and charging toward the Umpire at the Bowler's end. As there were multiple incidents involving multiple players, team captain Sourav Ganguly was also cited for failing to control his team's behaviour. In addition to forfeiture of a certain percentage of their match fees, the following suspensions were handed to the Indian players:
 Sachin Tendulkar: suspended ban for one Test Match due to ball-tampering charges.
 Virender Sehwag: banned for one Test match due to excessive appealing.
 Sourav Ganguly: suspended ban for one Test match and two One Day Internationals due to inability to control the behaviour of his team.
 Harbhajan Singh: suspended ban for one Test match due to excessive appealing.
 Shiv Sunder Das: suspended ban for one Test match due to excessive appealing.
 Deep Dasgupta: suspended ban for one Test match due to excessive appealing.

Denness was heavily criticised for failing to explain his actions at the press conference announcing the punishments, which was caused by the ICC regulations preventing Denness from doing anything more than explaining the charges. Indian journalists hounded Denness regarding an alleged failure to fine Shaun Pollock for what Indian reporters described as "similar" incidents of excessive appealing.  This infuriated the Indian cricket establishment, precipitating an international cricketing, political and administrative crisis.  In response to Denness's inability to explain his actions at the press conference, former Indian cricketer Ravi Shastri, who was then working as a commentator,  stated "If Mike Denness cannot answer questions, why is he here? We know what he looks like."

Public outrage, "Unofficial" Test and Sehwag's ban
There was a huge outrage in India where protestors took to the streets and burnt effigies of Denness. The matter was raised in the Indian parliament, the popular press termed Denness a racist, and the ICC was accused of discriminating against the emerging Third World. 

The Board of Control for Cricket in India (BCCI) threatened to call off its tour of South Africa unless Denness was replaced as match referee for the third Test, scheduled for 23-27 November at SuperSport Park, Centurion.  The International Cricket Council (ICC) supported Denness but the South African board sided with the BCCI's position and the two teams played an "unofficial" Test instead.  Denness, who was not even allowed to enter the stadium, was replaced as match referee by the South African Denis Lindsay. Consequently, the ICC declared the match to be "unofficial" and instead classified it as a "friendly five-day match"; the Test series was thus limited to the two matches already completed, with South Africa winning 1–0.

The ICC upheld the ban on Sehwag for the subsequent Test, but overturned the bans on Tendulkar and Ganguly. The subsequent England tour to India was placed in jeopardy when India picked Sehwag in the Test squad. Subsequent to this development, the ICC issued a warning that any Test match with Sehwag in the Indian team would not be considered an official Test until Sehwag served his ban. After negotiations with the England and Wales Cricket Board (ECB) and the ICC, and in the general interest of cricket, Sehwag was dropped from the team for the first Test against England.

After the incident
Mike Denness served as match referee in only two more Tests and three more One Day Internationals. These were all in the series between Pakistan and the West Indies in Sharjah, United Arab Emirates, during January and February 2002. He retired as a match referee for health reasons, and died in 2013 from cancer.

An ICC Disputes Resolution Committee hearing headed by Michael Beloff QC, the then Chairman of the ICC Code of Conduct Commission, was scheduled to hear the case on 6–7 June 2002. But the hearing was postponed a week before its scheduled date due to the ill-health and surgery plans of Denness.

The Resolution Committee never met to decide on the merits of the cases of Denness and the Indian team as the BCCI decided to forgo the case in view of Denness' heart surgery.

See also
 Indian cricket team in South Africa in 2001–02

References

Cricket controversies
2001 in Indian cricket